Stolen Sweeties is a 1924 2-reel short comedy silent film directed by Philadelphian director, Benjamin Stoloff. It was released by Fox Film.

External links

1924 films
1924 comedy films
American silent short films
American black-and-white films
Films directed by Benjamin Stoloff
1924 short films
Silent American comedy films
American comedy short films
1920s American films